Christine P. Barnetson (5 March 1948 – 19 June 2019) was an Australian swimmer. She competed in the women's 200 metre breaststroke at the 1964 Summer Olympics.

Barnetson was born on 5 March 1948 in Perth, Western Australia. She attended Perth College, where at the age of sixteen she was selected to represent Australia at the 1964 Summer Olympics in Tokyo.

After the Olympics she went to graduate with a Bachelor of Education and Diploma of Physical Education from the University of Western Australia, later obtaining a Masters in Education Administration from the University of New England, Armidale. Barnetson taught in the Western Australian government school system before taking up an academic position at the WA College of Advanced Education, which subsequently became Edith Cowan University.

In 2009, she was inducted into the Swimming WA Hall of Fame.

References

External links
 

1948 births
2019 deaths
Olympic swimmers of Australia
Swimmers at the 1964 Summer Olympics
Universiade medalists in swimming
Swimmers from Perth, Western Australia
Universiade bronze medalists for Australia
Medalists at the 1967 Summer Universiade
Australian female breaststroke swimmers
20th-century Australian women
21st-century Australian women